Svēte may refer to:

Svēte River, a river that flows through the northern part of Lithuania and the southern part of Latvia
Svēte parish, an administrative unit of the Jelgava District, Latvia
Svēte, a populated place in Svēte parish
Svēte Manor, a manor in Svēte parish, in the region of Zemgale, Latvia